Ali Abdolalizadeh is an Iranian reformist politician who held office as the Minister of Housing and Urban Development under President Mohammad Khatami.

He represented his hometown Urmia in the Iranian Parliament from 1984 to 1992 and East Azerbaijan Province from 1992 to 1997.

References

People from Urmia
University of Tabriz alumni
Government ministers of Iran
1955 births
Living people
Deputies of Urmia
Members of the 3rd Islamic Consultative Assembly
Members of the 2nd Islamic Consultative Assembly
Governors of East Azerbaijan Province
Impeached Iranian officials
Executives of Construction Party politicians